Cassina Rizzardi is a town and comune in the province of Como, in Lombardy.

References

Cities and towns in Lombardy